Sport Club Corinthians Paulista, has a futsal team based in São Paulo. Active since the 1970s it has won one Liga Futsal and twelve Liga Paulista de Futsal.

Club honours

National competitions
 Liga Futsal: 2016, 2022
 Taça Brasil de Futsal: 1974, 2010
 Copa do Brasil de Futsal: 2018, 2019
 Supercopa do Brasil de Futsal: 2019, 2020, 2021
 Taça Brasil 1a Divisão: 2014

State competitions
 Campeonato Paulista de Futsal (10): 1971, 1972, 1973, 1978, 1980, 1981, 1995, 2009, 2019, 2022
 Liga Paulista de Futsal (5): 2013, 2015, 2016, 2018, 2019
 Supercopa Paulista de Futsal (1): 2019
 Campeonato Metropolitano de Futsal (8): 1973, 1974, 1980, 1982, 1983, 2004, 2006, 2010

Current squad

See also

 Corinthians
 Corinthians (women's football)
 Corinthians (beach soccer)
 Corinthians (basketball)
 Corinthians Steamrollers (american football)
 Corinthians (rugby)

References

External links
 Corinthians Futsal official website
 Corinthians LNF profile
 Corinthians Futsal in zerozero.pt

Futsal
Futsal clubs in Brazil
Sports teams in São Paulo (state)